The 2019 Karnataka political crisis was a period of political instability when members of the legislative assembly in the Indian State of Karnataka submitted their resignations, which led to the fall of the Congress-JD(S) coalition government in the state.

Background
In the 2018 elections to the Karnataka Legislative Assembly, the Bharatiya Janata Party (BJP) won the most seats, 104, but the Indian National Congress (INC) and Janata Dal (Secular) (JD(S)) formed a coalition government with 120 out of 224 seats. In the 2019 general election, the BJP-led NDA won 26 out of 28 seats in Karnataka while the INC-led UPA won two.

Resignations
On 1 July, two members, Ramesh Jarkiholi and Anand Singh of the INC submitted their resignations. Over the next few days, ten INC and three JD(S) legislators resigned.

The reaction of the coalition government was to attempt to convince the legislators who had submitted their resignations to rescind them. Many of the legislators fled to Mumbai, and directed the police not to permit INC leaders to meet them. The government also attempted to induce the legislators to return by offering them cabinet posts; all 21 INC ministers resigned on 8 July to ensure that a sufficient number of ministerial berths were available. It also requested that the speaker should disqualify those who had resigned under anti-defection legislation.

The speaker, K. R. Ramesh Kumar, did not immediately accept the resignations, on grounds that he was constitutionally obliged to scrutinize them. Consequently, some of those who had submitted their resignations approached the Supreme Court, which on 12 July agreed to hear the case on 16 July, whilst ordering the speaker not to disqualify any lawmakers or take any other action in this connection.

At the 16 July hearing, Mukul Rohatgi, counsel for the legislators who had submitted their resignations, said that the speaker should be ordered to rule immediately on the resignations. Rohatgi argued that disqualification was a "mini-trial", and so a decision on the resignations should take priority over one on disqualification. Rajeev Dhavan, who appeared for the Chief Minister of Karnataka, argued that the legislators never met the speaker, and consequently the speaker should rule on their disqualifications first. Ranjan Gogoi, the Chief Justice, said that the court would have to balance two competing claims: first, the excuse of resignation could not be used to circumvent anti-defection measures; but, second, claims of defection should not be used to prevent resignation. He also said that the court would have to consider the extent to which it is permitted to issue directions to holders of other constitutional posts, such as that of the speaker of the assembly.

Members responsible for the Crisis
14 INC and 3 JD(S) legislators were responsible for the political crisis. One Karnataka Pragnyavantha Janatha Party legislator also left the coalition government. A few days later, INC legislator Ramalinga Reddy withdrew his resignation.

List of members who took back resignation

List of disqualified legislators

Reaction and conclusion
The INC  members in the Rajya Sabha forced adjournments twice in protest, alleging bribery on the part of the BJP. The BJP demanded that the government should resign.

Eventually the Congress-JD(S) coalition was reduced to 101 seats, whilst the BJP retained 105. After three weeks of turmoil, Kumarasamy lost a trust vote and resigned. On 26 July 2019, B. S. Yediyurappa was sworn in as Chief Minister of Karnataka once again.

See also
 2010s in political history
 2018 Karnataka Legislative Assembly election
 2019 Karnataka Legislative Assembly by-elections

References

Politics of Karnataka
2019 in Indian politics
Political crises in India